Le droit à la vie is a 1917 silent French film directed by Abel Gance.

Cast
 Paul Vermoyal as Pierre Veryal
 Léon Mathot as Jacques Alberty
 Andrée Brabant as Andree Mael
 Georges Paulais as Marc Toln
 Eugénie Bade as Grandmother
 Lebrey as Magistrate
 Anthony Gildès

References

External links

1917 films
1910s French-language films
French silent feature films
French black-and-white films
Films directed by Abel Gance
1910s French films